KBSZ (1260 AM; "The Rattler") is a commercial radio station broadcasting a classic rock radio format. Licensed to Apache Junction, Arizona, the station is owned by 1TV.com.  The studios and offices are on Broadway in Miami, Arizona. 

By day, KBSZ is powered at 4,500 watts.  But to protect other stations on AM 1260 from interference, it must reduce power at night to 50 watts. KBSZ uses an extremely short lower efficiency fiberglass whip antenna, broadcasting a non-directional pattern day and night.  The transmitter is on South Royal Palm Path in Apache Junction.  Programming is also heard on 250-watt FM translator K247CF at 97.3 MHz in Payson.

History

KSWW Wickenburg
The Wickenburg Radio Company received a construction permit for a new radio station in Wickenburg, Arizona, on October 25, 1967. KSWW broadcast as a 500-watt daytimer at 1250 kHz. The majority stockholder was W. Schuyler Thurber, a former department store owner.

KSWW was the second attempt to build a radio station on the frequency in Wickenburg. The first was KAKA, which had signed on August 28, 1960. It was owned by Mamie Gander and Paul Mullenix; Lowell F. Beer bought out Gander in 1962. However, KAKA and short-lived sister station KTPM in Sun City went into receivership and were shuttered in 1963.

Off the air
Thurber's share in KSWW was bought in 1972 by Joyce Stirling, but it went bankrupt in December 1979 and was silent for 16 months. Lee Shoblom bought the silent KSWW for $80,000 and returned it to air on March 11, 1981, as country music station KUUK. Shoblom lost out on its first attempt to acquire an FM counterpart to KUUK in 1982 when Hassayampa Broadcasting was awarded the permit. However, the two stations would eventually be united. In 1983, Shoblom sold KUUK to the Wickenburg Broadcasting Company, and two years later, the same principals acquired the FM permit. On January 1, 1987, the FM station launched, and the two stations became KCIW-AM-FM with a country music format. Kenyon Communications bought the stations in 1988.  When the FM station got a power increase to 50,000 watts, on August 2, 1989, the two stations changed to an adult standards format as KTIM-AM-FM.

Interstate Broadcasting Systems of Arizona acquired both stations in the fall of 1990, but the acquisition was primarily for KTIM-FM, which Interstate planned to use as an FM counterpart to its KRDS 1190 AM. On November 27, 1990, KTIM-FM became KRDS-FM (today's KHOV-FM).  With no plans to keep the AM station, Interstate sold it to Circle S Broadcasting, owned by Harold Shumway. Shumway renovated a former Big W restaurant to serve as station offices. Shumway then obtained an FM construction permit for Wickenburg on 93.7 MHz and signed it on as KFMA in 1992.

KBSZ
On March 1, 1996, KTIM became KBSZ, call letters then in use by the sister FM station.  However, the FM flipped to country music soon after, using the call letters KSWG.

The next year, Circle S sold KBSZ to SBD Broadcasting.  Four years later, SBD sold the station to Richard (Pete) and Joann Peterson. The Petersons relaunched the station with entirely local programming, including Wickenburg High School football games.

Move to Apache Junction
On November 7, 2007, the Petersons filed to move KBSZ's transmitter and city of license from Wickenburg (about 60 miles northwest of downtown Phoenix) to Apache Junction (35 miles east of downtown Phoenix).  The move was accompanied by a frequency change to 1260 kHz.  The switch to 1260 AM allowed it to broadcast around the clock.  A month later, the station was sold to 1TV.com, Inc., owned by John Low.

In 2010, KBSZ signed on from its new Apache Junction location with a Classic Hits/Oldies format targeting the residents of Phoenix's growing eastern suburbs. After only four months, the station adopted a talk radio format on Sept. 7. It was the first radio station on the frequency in Pinal County since KFAS Casa Grande signed off in the mid-1990s.

Comedy and Classic Rock
After a short time as a talk station, KBSZ flipped to an all-comedy format.  It used a syndicated comedy programming service known as "24/7 Comedy." When the network ceased operations, the station wanted to keep its comedy format, so it switched programming to "Today's Comedy."  In 2012, KBSZ was issued a U.S. Federal Communications Commission construction permit to increase its daytime power to 4,500 watts from its previous 3,500 watts.  

Around July 1, 2019, KBSZ fell silent without any explanation. On July 8, 2019, the station posted a message on its website that KBSZ had ceased broadcasting the comedy format "due to circumstances beyond our control."  It would soon be simulcasting sister station KIKO-FM's oldies format. 

After nearly two weeks of broadcasting with dead air, KBSZ returned with a classic rock format named "The Rattler".  The programming is largely automated.  The station carries the weekly syndicated program "Floydian Slip," focusing on the music of Pink Floyd.

Former logos

References

External links

 FCC construction permit

BSZ
Radio stations established in 1968
Classic rock radio stations in the United States
1968 establishments in Arizona